Hienghène (Fwâi: Hyehen) is a commune in the North Province of New Caledonia, an overseas territory of France in the Pacific Ocean. It is located on a bay called Hienghène Bay, known for its eroded limestone islets.

The islets are remnants of a limestone and silica formation that once covered the whole of the bay, some 40 million years ago. Erosion from wind and water carved away the softer limestone, leaving the harder silica behind in eye-catching formations. Several of these formations have been given fanciful names, such as the Sphinx, the Towers of Notre Dame, and the Hen (pictured).

References

Communes of New Caledonia